Muthale Girls' High School is a girls' boarding secondary school in Kitui County. It is the only other national school (after Kitui School) in the county after it was elevated to national school status in 2011. The school is located along Kitui-Mwingi road in hilly terrain of Mutonguni and borders Muthale Mission Hospital. The school has a population of 800 students, 30 teachers and 15 subordinate staff. It is one of the best performing schools in Kenya.

History
The school was established by the Franciscan Sisters for Africa in 1970. The Franciscan Sisters had founded Muthale Mission Hospital in 1948. The school started as mixed day school before changing to girls school the same year it was founded.

References

Boarding schools in Kenya
High schools and secondary schools in Kenya
Girls' schools in Kenya
1970 establishments in Kenya
Educational institutions established in 1970
Kitui County
Education in Eastern Province (Kenya)